Sogndalsfjorden is a fjord in Sogndal Municipality in Vestland county, Norway. It then flows to the southwest before emptying into the large Sognefjorden at its mouth between the villages of Nornes and Fimreite.

The Norwegian National Road 5 highway crosses the fjord between the villages of Sogndalsfjøra and Kjørnes. The Norwegian County Road 55 runs along the northern shore of the fjord, the entire length of the fjord. The innermost part of the fjord is also known as the Barsnesfjorden.

See also 
 List of Norwegian fjords

References 

Fjords of Vestland
Sogndal